Eupromus ruber is a species of beetle in the family Cerambycidae. It was described by Dalman in 1817. It is known from Japan, China, and Taiwan. It feeds on Cinnamomum camphora and Cunninghamia lanceolata.

References

Lamiini
Beetles described in 1817